7 Songs Belfast is a live EP by Mark Kozelek. The limited edition CD was made available in July 2008, as a free gift with any order of a CD, t-shirt or vinyl record purchased via Caldo Verde Records' website. Starting from September 1, 2008, the EP was made available as a digital download. Tracks 1-6 were recorded live at the Blackbox in Belfast on November 4, 2007, and track 7 was recorded live at the Dancehouse Theatre in Manchester on October 30, 2007.

Track listing

Notes
 Mark Kozelek – vocals, guitar
 Phil Carney – guitar
 Photography by Nyree Watts
 Design by Brian Azer

References

2008 EPs
Mark Kozelek albums
Caldo Verde Records albums
Albums produced by Mark Kozelek